Zulu Adigwe is a Nigerian actor and singer, best known for paternal roles in Nollywood movies. He first achieved fame as Mr. B in the sitcom Basi and Company, and most recently featured in the 2019 blockbuster Living in Bondage: Breaking Free.

Early life
Adigwe was born in Enugu where he spent most of his childhood, but moved to Austria where he attended primary and secondary school. Prior to acting he studied French and German, worked as a teacher, and briefly studied Medicine before returning to Nigeria after his father's death. He enrolled with the University of Ibadan where he studied Theatre Arts, graduating with First Class Honours.

Career
Adigwe's interest in acting started when he was seven. His earliest appearance on Nigerian television was in  Basi and Company where he played the lead character Mr. B, replacing former actor Albert Egbe who left the series after a dispute with the show's creator Ken Saro-Wiwa. Adigwe's introduction to the cast saw Mr. B re-invented as a guitar-strumming layabout composing and singing get-rich-quick ditties. He also performed Basi and Company's new theme song, and an album coinciding with the series - Mr. B Makes His Millions - was released under Polygram Nigeria in 1990.

In 1991, Adigwe was among the original cast of Checkmate, playing lecherous university lecturer Monday Edem in the pilot episode, but the role was recast after production moved from Enugu to Lagos. His first movie was Blood of the Orphan, which earned him acclamation and recognition. In 2004, he also starred in Living Abroad, directed by Elvis Chuks and also starring Ernest Asuzu, Emeka Enyiocha, and Anne Njemanze. In 2019, Adigwe featured as Pascal Nworie in Living in Bondage: Breaking Free.

Filmography

Film

Television

See also 
 List of Nigerian actors

References

External links 
 Zulu Adigwe Biography on IMDb

Nigerian male television actors
Living people
Year of birth missing (living people)
20th-century Nigerian male actors
Male actors from Enugu State
Actors from Enugu State
University of Ibadan alumni
Igbo actors
Nigerian male film actors